Novak Djokovic defeated the defending champion David Ferrer in the final, 7–5, 7–5, to win the singles title at the 2013 Paris Masters. It was his second Paris Masters title.

Seeds
All seeds receive a bye into the second round.

Draw

Finals

Top half

Section 1

Section 2

Bottom half

Section 3

Section 4

Qualifying

Seeds

Qualifiers

Lucky losers
  Pablo Andújar

Qualifying draw

First qualifier

Second qualifier

Third qualifier

Fourth qualifier

Fifth qualifier

Sixth qualifier

References
General
 Main Draw
 Qualifying Draw
Specific

2013 ATP World Tour
2013 Singles